Scent of a Woman is a 1974 Commedia all'italiana film directed by Dino Risi, based on Il buio e il miele, a story by Giovanni Arpino. Both Risi and the leading actor Vittorio Gassman won important Italian and French awards. An American remake, Scent of a Woman, was released in 1992.

Plot
A blind Italian Captain (Fausto Consolo), accompanied by his aide Ciccio (Giovanni Bertazzi), who has been assigned to him by the army, is on his way from Turin to Naples to meet with an old comrade who was also disfigured in the same military incident. Unknown to his aide, the Captain means to fulfill a suicide pact there with his old comrade. While they journey, the Captain asks Ciccio to help him spot beautiful women. Unsatisfied with the boy's descriptions, he uses his nose instead, claiming that he can smell a beautiful woman. During their journey, he carries with him a picture of his beloved Sara, whom he could not bear to have see him disfigured and helpless. The suicide pact is eventually thwarted once Sara enters the picture, and the boy Ciccio does some much-needed growing up.

Cast
 Vittorio Gassman: Fausto Consolo
 Alessandro Momo: Giovanni Bertazzi
 Agostina Belli: Sara
 Moira Orfei: Mirka
 Torindo Bernardi: Vincenzo
 Alvaro Vitali: Vittorio

Awards
Profumo di donna was nominated for two Academy Awards in 1976 as Best Foreign Film and as Best Writing, Screenplay Adapted From Other Material.
David di Donatello, Best Actor (Vittorio Gassman), 1975
David di Donatello, Best Director (Dino Risi), 1975
Nastro d'Argento, Best Actor (Vittorio Gassman), 1975
1975 Cannes Film Festival, Best Actor (Vittorio Gassman)
César Award for Best Foreign Film, 1976

See also
 List of submissions to the 48th Academy Awards for Best Foreign Language Film
 List of Italian submissions for the Academy Award for Best Foreign Language Film

References

External links

http://www.escrevercinema.com/Risi_PerfumedeMulher.htm

1974 films
1974 comedy films
1970s Italian-language films
Commedia all'italiana
Best Foreign Film César Award winners
Films about blind people
Films directed by Dino Risi
Films set in Turin
Films set in Genoa
Films set in Rome
Films set in Naples
Films with screenplays by Ruggero Maccari
Films scored by Armando Trovajoli
1970s Italian films